Khvajeh may refer to:

Afghanistan

Khvajeh Hasan, a village in Bamyan Province
Khvajeh Jeyran, a village in Baghlan Province
Khvajeh Kowshah, a village in Bamyan Province
Khvajeh Owlia', a village in Baghlan Province
Khvajeh Qalandar, a village in Badghis Province

Iran
Khvajeh, Iran, a city in East Azerbaijan Province
Khvajeh Bolaghi, a village in Ardabil Province
Khvajeh Aur, a village in East Azerbaijan Province
Khvajeh, Marvdasht, a village in Fars Province
Khvajeh, Neyriz, a village in Fars Province
Khvajeh Lar, a village in Golestan Province
Khvajeh Hoseyni, a village in Hamadan Province
Khvajeh, Isfahan, a village in Isfahan Province
Khvajeh Askar, a village in Kerman Province
Khvajeh Nezam-e Chahar Dang, a village in Kerman Province
Khvajeh, Ramhormoz, a village in Khuzestan Province
Qaleh-ye Khvajeh, a city in Khuzestan Province
Khvajeh, Razavi Khorasan, a village in Razavi Khorasan Province
Khvajeh, Birjand, a village in South Khorasan Province
Khvajeh, Sarbisheh, a village in South Khorasan Province
Khvajeh, Zirkuh, a village in South Khorasan Province

See also
Khvajehi (disambiguation)
 Khawaja 
Khvajeh is a common element in Iranian place names; see All Wikipedia pages beginning with Khvajeh